Dichanthelium ovale, commonly known as  eggleaf rosette grass, is a plant found in North America. Dichanthelium ovale subsp. pseudopubescens, common name Stiff-leaved rosette-panicgrass is listed as a special concern and believed extirpated in Connecticut.

References

ovale